The Santa Ana Line was an interurban railway route connecting Los Angeles and Santa Ana in Orange County. It ran between 1905 and 1958 (with the southern end truncated to Bellflower in 1950) and was predominantly operated by the Pacific Electric Railway for its history.

History
The route began operation on November 6, 1905 under the Los Angeles Inter-Urban Electric Railway; Pacific Electric leased the line starting in 1908 and fully acquired it in 1911 under terms of the Great Merger. The Santa Ana Line was designated as route number 11 during most of its operational life. Santa Ana's status as the county seat and largest city in Orange County at the time allowed for high ridership. The railway built a new station in the city in late 1927, and cars were rerouted to serve it.

Cars ceased running to the Santa Ana Southern Pacific Depot in November 1945. By 1950, service had halved from its peak only five years earlier and the line was cut back to a minor station in Bellflower on July 2, becoming the Bellflower Line. (PE continued to serve the Bellflower to Santa Ana segment with motor coaches.) The service was then disposed of by Pacific Electric, being taken over first by Metropolitan Coach Lines in 1953 before being commuted to the Los Angeles Metropolitan Transit Authority in 1958, the same year it was discontinued; the last train ran on May 24, 1958. Bellflower Line service was briefly designated as line 34 for just over a month prior to discontinuance.

Modern services

The Los Angeles Metro Rail operates a few light rail lines over the former route. The A Line runs over the former Watts Line as far as Watts, and the C Line and Century Freeway were built through Lynwood on the old Pacific Electric right of way.

The West Santa Ana Branch Transit Corridor is a plan to reactivate part of the line in Los Angeles County for expanded light rail service. The section between Bellflower station and former Paramount station will be rehabilitated and connected to a new service eventually terminating downtown, though via a different routing than the former Santa Ana Line.

The Orange County Streetcar is expected to open in 2023 and run on the southern section of the former Santa Ana Line between Santa Ana and Garden Grove.

Route

The Santa Ana Line ran from the Pacific Electric Building in Los Angeles to the Southern Pacific depot in Santa Ana, California via the Watts Line and West Santa Ana Branch. The latter segment's diagonal running was a stark contrast to the cardinally-aligned road grid of Los Angeles and Orange Counties.

The route was quadruple-tracked through the Watts trunk line, while the Santa Ana Branch was double-tracked except at single-track bridges.

List of major stations

Ridership

References

External links

Pacific Electric routes
History of Santa Ana, California
Transportation in Santa Ana, California
Railway services introduced in 1905
Railway services discontinued in 1958
1905 establishments in California
1958 disestablishments in California
Closed railway lines in the United States